Paul Lovens (born 6 June 1949) is a German musician. He plays drums, percussion, singing saw, and cymbals. He has performed with the Aardvark Jazz Orchestra and Berlin Contemporary Jazz Orchestra.

He was born in Aachen, Germany. In the early 1970s, he was part of a trio with pianist Alexander von Schlippenbach. Since then he has worked with Cecil Taylor, Harri Sjöström, Günther Christmann, Eugene Chadbourne, Peter Brötzmann, Teppo Hauta-Aho, Mats Gustafsson, Thomas Lehn, Phil Wachsmann, Rajesh Mehta and Joëlle Léandre. He also played with Florian Schneider and Ebehard Kranemann in an early incarnation of Kraftwerk. Since 1967, Lovens has run the record label Po Torch with Paul Lytton.

Discography

As leader
 Voerkel/Frey/Lovens (FMP, 1976)
 Carpathes with Michel Pilz, Peter Kowald (FMP, 1976)
 Was It Me with Paul Lytton (Po Torch, 1977)
 Paul Rutherford/Paul Lovens (Po Torch, 1978)
 Moinho Da Asneira with Paul Lytton (Po Torch, 1980)
 Weavers with Gunter Christmann, Maarten Altena (Po Torch, 1980)
 The Last Supper with Toshinori Kondo (Po Torch, 1981)
 Der Traum Der Roten Plame (FMP, 1982)
 Death Is Our Eternal Friend with Toshinori Kondo (DIW, 1983)
 The Fetch with Paul Lytton (Po Torch, 1984)
 Stranger Than Love with Alexander von Schlippenbach (Po Torch, 1985)
 News from the Shed with Butcher/Durrant/Malfatti/Russell (Acta, 1989)
 Regalia with Cecil Taylor (FMP, 1989)
 Goldberg with Urs Voerkel (Po Torch, 1990)
 Nothing to Read with Mats Gustafsson (Blue Tower, 1991)
 Choice-Chase with Stephan Wittwer (Intakt, 1995)
 Mouth Eating Trees and Related Activities with Mats Gustafsson (Okka Disk, 1996)
 Patrizio with Eugene Chadbourne (Victo, 1997)
 Quicksand with Frank Gratkowski (Meniscus, 2001)
 Papajo (Emanem, 2002)
 Acthung with Thomas Lehn (Grob, 2003)
 Trio with Christmann/Gustaffson (FMP  2010)
 Wegen Meines with Moodswing 3 (Rai Trade, 2010)
 Live at Hasselt with Vandeweyer/Van Hove/Blume (NoBusiness, 2013)
 Live 2013 with Stefan Keune (FMR, 2016)
 Mein Freund Der Baum with Stoffner/Mahall (Wide Ear, 2017)
 The Room: Time and Space with Seppe Gebruers, Hugo Antunes (El Negocito, 2018)  
 Nothing Particularly Horrible with Keune/Russell/Schneider (FMR, 2019)
 Meeting the Past (Zarek, 2020)

With Globe Unity Orchestra
 Live in Wuppertal (FMP, 1973)
 Der Alte Mann Bricht ... Sein Schweigen (FMP, 1974)
 Bavarian Calypso & Good Bye (FMP, 1975)
 Evidence Vol. 1 (FMP, 1976)
 Into the Valley Vol. 2 (FMP, 1976)
 Pearls (FMP, 1977)
 Jahrmarkt & Local Fair (Po Torch, 1977)
 Improvisations (Japo, 1978)
 Hamburg '74 (FMP, 1979)
 Compositions (Japo, 1980)
 Intergalactic Blow (Japo, 1983)
 Rumbling (FMP, 1991)
 20th Anniversary (FMP, 1993)
 Globe Unity 2002 (Intakt, 2003)
 Baden-Baden '75 (FMP, 2011)

As sideman
With Alfred Harth
 Es Herrscht Uhu Im Land (Japo, 1981)
 1970–1971 (Laubhuette, 2007)
 Groups Duos (Laubhuette, 2009)

With Sven-Ake Johansson
 Idylle & Katastrophen (Po Torch, 1980)
 Uber Ursache & Wirkung Der Meinungsverschiedenheiten Beim Turmbau Zu Babel (FMP, 1989)
 Fur Paul Klee (Jazzwerkstatt, 2012)

With Evan Parker
 The Ericle of Dolphi (Po Torch, 1989)
 50th Birthday Concert (Leo, 1994)
 2x3=5 (Leo, 2001)

With Mario Schiano
 Unlike (Splasc(H), 1990)
 Meetings (Splasc(H), 1994)
 Used to Be Friends (Splasc(H), 1996)
 Social Security (Victo, 1997)

With Alexander von Schlippenbach
 Pakistani Pomade (FMP, 1973)
 Three Nails Left (FMP, 1975)
 The Hidden Peak (FMP, 1977)
 Anticlockwise (FMP, 1983)
 Das Hohe Lied (Po Torch, 1991)
 Detto Fra Di Noi (Po Torch, 1982)
 Elf Bagatellen (FMP, 1990)
 Physics (FMP, 1993)
 The Morlocks and Other Pieces (FMP, 1994)
 Complete Combustion (FMP, 1999)
 Swinging the Bim (FMP, 2000)
 Hunting the Snake (Atavistic, 2000)
 Globe Unity 67 & 70 (Atavistic, 2001)
 Broomriding (Psi, 2003)
 Compression: Live at Total Music Meeting 2002 (a/l/l, 2004)
 Winterreise (Psi, 2006)
 Globe Unity 40 Years (Intakt, 2007)
 Gold Is Where You Find It (Intakt, 2008)
 Bauhaus Dessau (Intakt, 2010)
 First Recordings (Trost, 2014)
 Features (Intakt, 2015)
 Warsaw Concert (Intakt, 2016)
 Globe Unity 50 Years (Intakt, 2018)

With Aki Takase
 St. Louis Blues (Enja, 2001)
 Plays Fats Waller (Enja, 2003)
 New Blues (Yellowbird, 2012)
 Plays Fats Waller in Berlin (Jazzwerkstatt, 2013)
 Signals (Trost, 2016)

With others
 Rajesh Mehta, Orka:solos and duos feat. Paul Lovens (Hatology, 1998)
 Aardvark Jazz Orchestra, Trumpet Madness (Leo, 2005)
 Maarten Altena, Pisa 1980: Improvisors' Symposium (Incus, 1981)
 Berlin Contemporary Jazz Orchestra, Live in Japan '96 (DIW, 1997)
 Paul Burwell, Circadian Rhythm (Incus, 1980)
 Eugene Chadbourne, Hellington Country (Intakt, 1997)
 Gunter Christmann, Sometimes Crosswise (Moers Music, 1995)
 Ivar Grydeland, These Six (Sofa, 2003)
 Peter Kowald, Peter Kowald Quintet (FMP, 1973)
 Joelle Leandre, Joëlle Léandre Project (Leo, 2000)
 Joelle Leandre, At the Le Mans Jazz Festival (Leo, 2006)
 Guerino Mazzola, Synthesis (Stoa Music, 1991)
 Irène Schweizer, Ramifications (Ogun, 1975)
 Irène Schweizer, Live at Taktlos (Intakt, 1986)
 Cecil Taylor, Lifting the Bandstand (Fundacja Słuchaj!, 2021)
 Philipp Wachsmann, Free Zone Appleby 2006 (Psi, 2007)

References

1949 births
Living people
Free jazz percussionists
German drummers
German male musicians
Male drummers
Male jazz musicians
Berlin Contemporary Jazz Orchestra members
Globe Unity Orchestra members
ECM Records artists
Emanem Records artists
FMP/Free Music Production artists
Incus Records artists
Leo Records artists
Intakt Records artists
DIW Records artists
Okka Disk artists
NoBusiness Records artists